Faizal Zainal (born 12 February 1974) is a retired Malaysian international footballer.

His twin brother, Khairil Zainal was also a footballer. Their younger brother, Abdul Halim Zainal is currently a footballer with Negeri Sembilan FA, where the twins formerly played for.

References

External links
 

1974 births
Living people
Sportspeople from Kuala Lumpur
Malaysian footballers
Malaysia international footballers
Negeri Sembilan FA players
Perak F.C. players
Malaysian twins
Twin sportspeople
Association football midfielders
Footballers at the 1994 Asian Games
Asian Games competitors for Malaysia